Gayleen Aiken (March 25, 1934 – 2005) was an American artist who lived in Barre, Vermont. She achieved critical acclaim during her lifetime for her naive paintings and her work has been included in exhibitions of visionary and folk art since the 1980s. She is considered an Outsider artist.

Life
Aiken was born in Barre, Vermont, on March 25, 1934. She was self-taught as an artist. In the early 1980s she was discovered by Grass Roots Art and Community Effort (GRACE), a Vermont grass-roots arts organization. GRACE's exhibition program exhibited her work for the first time.

Work
Gayleen Aiken produced paintings and drawings that often combined narrative text and image, cardboard cut-outs, and book works. She used crayon, pen, pencil, and oil paint. Her themes included music and musical instruments, the large old farmhouse where she grew up, the lyricism of Vermont's seasons, the granite industry, and rural life. These themes were connected via a cast of recurring characters, members of an imaginary extended family which she called the Raimbilli Cousins.

In popular culture 
Jay Craven's 1985 documentary, Gayleen, details Aiken's life and artworks.

Awards
In 1987, Aiken was a recipient of a Vermont Council on the Arts fellowship. In 1997, Harry B. Abrams, Inc. released Moonlight and Music: The Enchanted World of Gayleen Aiken, produced with the novelist Rachel Klein. Her artwork has been featured in The New York Times, Raw Vision, The Boston Globe, Smithsonian, and Folk Art Magazine.

Collections and exhibits

Aikens's works are included in the permanent collections of the Smithsonian American Art Museum, Washington, D.C.;  Abby Aldrich Rockefeller Folk Art Museum, Williamsburg, VA; Museum of American Folk Art, New York, NY and Pennsylvania Academy of the Fine Arts Museum, Philadelphia, PA.

Aikens's art has also been featured in many exhibitions, including at Lincoln Center Gallery, the American Visionary Art Museum, and Works by Gayleen Aiken (2002) at the Vermont Granite Museum. She had a one-woman show of about 30 paintings in the Gallery at Lincoln Center in New York City in 1987.

Posthumous solo exhibits of her work include Our Yard in the Future: The Art of Gayleen Aiken, an exhibit curated by artist Peter Gallo, at the SUNDAY L.E.S. (now Horton Gallery) in New York City in 2007, and Cousins, Quarries and a Nickelodeon at the Luise Ross Gallery, New York in 2013.

She was featured in the 2013 Outsider Art Fair.

References

External links
GRACE Gallery of art works by Gayleen Aiken 
Review: Gayleen Aiken @ SUNDAY in the Brooklyn Rail
http://www.nytimes.com/2013/02/01/arts/design/outsider-art-fair-opens-at-548-west-22nd-street.html?ref=todayspaper&_r=1&
Gayleen Aiken at Luise Ross Gallery
Article: Raw Vision Magazine
 

American women painters
1934 births
2005 deaths
20th-century American painters
Outsider artists
Naïve painters
20th-century American women artists
Women outsider artists
People from Barre, Vermont
Painters from Vermont
21st-century American painters
21st-century American women artists